Frederick Rudolph (1920 – June 3, 2013) was an American historian of U.S. higher education. He was the Mark Williams Professor of History at Williams College and authored The American College and University: A History.

References

American historians of education
1920 births
2013 deaths
Williams College faculty